HSwMS Norrköping was a destroyer of the Royal Swedish Navy that served during the Second World War and in the Cold War. After the Second World War, in 1948, the destroyer took part in a European tour with other Swedish warships, led by the cruiser , which involved sailing to the Netherlands, Norway and the United Kingdom. Between 1950 and 1951, the ship was upgraded, with new more effective anti-aircraft weapons, new electronics and a slight increase in beam and displacement, In 1952, the destroyer went on another tour, accompanied by the cruiser , to Belgium. Rerated a frigate in 1961, the vessel was decommissioned on 1 February 1965. Subsequently used as a target ship, Norrköping was finally sunk on 26 May 1977.

Design and development

Norrköping was the last of this final batch to be ordered.

Power was provided by three Penhoët oil-fired boilers feeding two de Laval geared steam turbines driving two shafts. The ship had two funnels. In trials, the destroyer exceeded this.

The main armament consisted of three  K/45 M24C dual-purpose guns produced by Bofors. These were placed in separate mounts on the ship's centreline, with one on the forecastle, one aft and one between the funnels. The guns were of a loose-barrel type, weighed } and fired a  projectile at }. Air defence consisted six  M/40 autocannons in three twin mounts, also provided by Bofors. Two triple rotating torpedo tube mounts for  torpedoes were aft of the superstructure and two depth charge throwers were carried further towards the stern. Approximately forty mines could also be carried for minelaying. The ship had a complement of 135 officers and ratings.

Construction and career
Norrköping was laid down by Eriksbergs Mekaniska Verkstad in Gothenburg on 17 January 1940, launched on 5 September the same year and commissioned on 9 April the following year. The ship was named for the city and allocated the pennant number J10. The ship served with the fleet on patrols to protect Swedish neutrality. During 1944, the destroyer was involved in the evacuation of Estonia before the advancing Soviet Army. Norrköping rescued 173 refugees during September and October.

On 10 May 1948, the destroyer sailed from Gothenburg on the first day of a tour of European cities with sister ship Stockholm and the cruiser . The tour included five days in Bristol, seven days in Amsterdam and four in Trondheim, returning on 14 June. On 30 May 1952, the same two destroyers escorted the cruiser  on another visit, this time to Antwerp, returning on 2 July.

Between 1950 and 1951, the destroyer was given a substantial modernisation. The bridge was enlarged and better fire control was fitted, along with a tripod with radar to replace the pole mast. The armament was updated. The central gun was moved aft to a superfiring position,which greatly enhanced the operational capability as the funnels had restricted fire. The anti-aircraft guns were replaced with four single Bofors  guns.

Norrköping was rerated a frigate on 1 January 1961 along with the rest of the class but was not further updated. The destroyer did not serve long in this capacity and was decommissioned on 1 February 1965. Norrköping was subsequently used as a target ship until being sunk on 26 May 1977. The wreck lies near that of sister ship Göteborg.

References

Citations

Bibliography

 
 
 
 
 
 
 
 
 
 

1940 ships
Destroyers of the Swedish Navy
Ships built in Gothenburg
World War II naval ships of Sweden